Meeuwen may refer to:

 Meeuwen, Belgium, a village in the municipality of Meeuwen-Gruitrode
 Meeuwen, Netherlands, a village in the municipality of Altena

See also
 Van Meeuwen, a Dutch noble family